Manuel Lawrence Real (January 27, 1924 – June 26, 2019) was a United States district judge of the United States District Court for the Central District of California. He was appointed in 1966 by President Lyndon B. Johnson.

Early life, education, and career
Born in San Pedro, California to Spanish immigrant parents, Real received a Bachelor of Science degree from the University of Southern California in 1944 and a Bachelor of Laws from Loyola Law School in 1951. He was in the United States Navy Reserve during World War II, from 1943 to 1945. He was an Assistant United States Attorney for the Southern District of California from 1952 to 1955. He was in private practice in San Pedro from 1955 to 1964. He was the United States Attorney for the Southern District of California from 1964 to 1966.

Federal judicial service

On September 26, 1966, Real was nominated by President Lyndon B. Johnson to a new seat on the United States District Court for the Central District of California created by 80 Stat. 75. He was confirmed by the United States Senate on October 20, 1966, and received his commission on November 3, 1966. He served as Chief Judge of the district from 1982 to 1993. In 2006, House Judiciary Committee Chairman Jim Sensenbrenner, R-Wis., introduced a resolution permitting the Judiciary Committee to investigate Real to see whether impeachment hearings were warranted. The impeachment effort was later dropped. In 2008, Real received a public reprimand for his handling of a bankruptcy matter. Real assumed senior status on November 4, 2018.  He was the last federal court judge in active service to have been appointed by President Johnson, and measured by length of active service the third-longest-serving federal judge ever, and the longest-serving since the Civil War. He died on June 26, 2019, aged 95.

Decisions

Pasadena Unified School District
He was known for his January 22, 1970 decision ordering Pasadena Unified School District to adopt a plan to correct racial imbalance at all levels. "It is ordered, adjudged and decreed that the defendants, Pasadena City Board of Education, Mrs. LuVerne LaMotte, Albert C. Lowe, Bradford C. Houser, John T. Welsh, and Joseph J. Engholm, as members of the Pasadena City Board of Education, and Ralph W. Hornbeck, as Superintendent of Schools ... are enjoined from discriminating of the basis of race ... in the operation of the district." His decision: "Commencing in September of 1970, there shall be no school in the District elementary or junior high or senior high school, with a majority of any minority students." The board of education and the superintendent adopted a forced busing plan to meet the new legal mandate. Real did not order forced busing; that was creation of the Pasadena Unified School District.

Other cases
Real was noted for his judicial behavior in the 2000s. From 2001 to 2009, he had custody of disputed Filipino assets, for which he had to account in 2009. A federal appeals court panel ruled that his accounting "plainly fails to account for all transactions involving the assets during the eight years they were held in the clerk of court's custody. It doesn't give the reader even a basic understanding of the path by which $33.8 million worth of assets deposited in September 2000 came to be worth $34.7 million today".

On January 11, 2012, the Ninth Circuit removed Real from the controversial case of Alexander Sanchez, a former MS-13 gang leader turned gang interventionist. In November 2012 it was reported that Real had shown a pattern of making rulings in favor of companies in which he owned stock.

Real overturned the conviction of four men who conspired to rob a fictional cocaine stash house in a governmental reverse sting operation, citing outrageous government conduct. However, the 9th circuit reversed Real on May 17, 2016, and remanded the case to a different judge. 

On April 12, 2018, Real ruled that the Justice Department cannot require police forces to comply with its immigration enforcement criteria in order to receive funding.

See also
List of Hispanic/Latino American jurists
List of United States federal judges by longevity of service

Notes

References

External links

1924 births
2019 deaths
People from San Pedro, Los Angeles
American people of Spanish descent
Assistant United States Attorneys
Hispanic and Latino American judges
Judges of the United States District Court for the Central District of California
Lawyers from Los Angeles
Loyola Law School alumni
Loyola Marymount University alumni
Military personnel from California
United States Attorneys for the Southern District of California
United States district court judges appointed by Lyndon B. Johnson
University of Southern California alumni
20th-century American judges
21st-century judges